Mariana Duque Mariño (born 12 August 1989) is a Colombian retired tennis player. Having turned professional in 2005, she reached a career-high singles ranking of world No. 66 in October 2015.

Duque debuted on the ITF Junior Circuit in 2004. As a junior, she reached the final of the girls' singles tournament at the 2007 French Open. She defeated the tenth-seeded Ksenia Pervak in the first round, and ousted juniors' world No. 1, Anastasia Pavlyuchenkova, in the semifinals. Duque lost in the final to Alizé Cornet in three sets. She had some setbacks during the tournament, due to losing her tennis rackets at the airport. Without money to buy replacements, she had to play with borrowed rackets.

She won her first professional tournament in May 2006, in Mazatlán, Mexico. Her biggest win in senior competition is defeating 26th seed Anna Chakvetadze in the opening round of the 2009 French Open in three sets.

Professional career

2005–2006
In 2005, she appeared in her first WTA Tour qualifying in Bogotá and also played on the ITF Circuit. In the 2005 Bolivarian Games, she won the silver medal in singles and in doubles.

Duque fell 2006 in the qualifying in Bogotá, won three singles and three doubles titles on the ITF Circuit.

2007
In her third full season on the tour main draw, she arrived in the first round defeating compatriot Viky Núñez Fuentes and was defeated in the second round by Flavia Pennetta. The same year, she won three singles titles on ITF Circuit. At the Junior French Open, in her first appearance at a Grand Slam tournament, she was runner-up making history for Colombia as the first tennis player to reach such instance.

In Pan American Games, she arrived at the end confronting Venezuelan Milagros Sequera; the top-seed and favorite took home the gold medal for Venezuela and Mariana the silver medal, being one of the best achievements in her career. She also got the silver medal in doubles with compatriot Karen Castiblanco.

2008
At the US Open, Duque advanced to the second round by coming back to beat Tamarine Tanasugarn, ranked 19th in the world, after having lost the first set 0–6. In the second round, she lost in straight sets to Agnieszka Radwańska, ranked No. 9 in the world. Thanks to this presentation, she got into the top 100 players in the world for the first time by moving up two sports: 101 to 99.

She was also present at the WTA Tour event of Bogotá, where in the first round she confronted Jelena Kostanić Tošić, winning in straight sets. In the second round, she faced Yvonne Meusburger being the fifth seed in the tournament and against which Mariana Duque wins, in straight sets. In the quarterfinals, she confronted María Emilia Salerni to which Mariana fell in three sets.

In the first round of the Portugal Open, she won in straight sets against Monica Niculescu. In the second round, she fell to Karin Knapp who was seeded No. 3 in the tournament.

Duque Mariño won two singles and two doubles titles on the ITF Circuit.

2010–2014
Playing in her home country, Duque Mariño claimed her very first WTA title at the Copa Colsanitas defeating Gréta Arn, Kristina Antoniychuk, seventh seed Klára Zakopalová, eighth seed Arantxa Parra Santonja and fifth seed Angelique Kerber. Duque Mariño became the second Colombian woman to claim this title since Fabiola Zuluaga did it in 2004.

At the 2012 Summer Olympics, she competed in the women's singles, but was knocked out in the first round by Maria Kirilenko.

2015: Gold at Pan Am Games, and best WTA ranking
On July 11 through the 16th, Duque Mariño competed at the Pan American Games where she won a gold medal. The world No. 89 ousted the tournament's top-seed Lauren Davis in the semifinal stage of the tournament, while her opponent Victoria Rodríguez reached the final by taking out the second seeded Monica Puig. Yet when they crossed paths in the final, it was Duque Mariño who shone brightest. This marked the first time in the history of women's tennis a Colombian woman had won a gold medal.

Duque Mariño reached for the first time in her career the third round of a Grand Slam championship, where she beat American wildcard Sofia Kenin in the first round and Océane Dodin in the second. Duque is the second Colombian player to reach third round at the US Open, after Fabiola Zuluaga.

In the third round, she faced former world No. 11, Roberta Vinci, where she fell in three sets.

Duque Mariño kicked off the Asian swing at the Korea Open where she advanced to the second round defeating Kiki Bertens, before losing to No. 5 seed Mona Barthel, in straight sets. At the Wuhan Open, she qualified by defeating Casey Dellacqua and Christina McHale but failed to keep her momentum going when she lost to rising star Anna Karolína Schmiedlová, in straight sets. At the China Open, Duque Mariño breezed through qualifying by defeating wildcard Xu Yifan and Magda Linette both in straight sets. She set up a first-round match against former Wimbledon semifinalist Tsvetana Pironkova and defeated her in straight sets. She lost to eventual runner-up and No. 12 seed, Timea Bacsinszky. With her result at the China Open, Duque Mariño moved up the rankings to No. 66 in the world, making it her highest ranking.

2016: Second WTA final since 2010, and quarterfinals at Mallorca Open
Duque Mariño reached final at the Nürnberger Versicherungscup by defeating Carina Witthöft, Laura Siegemund, Varvara Lepchenko, and Annika Beck; she lost her final match against Kiki Bertens in straight sets.

In June at the Mallorca Open, she defeated No. 134, Alison Van Uytvanck, and then 2013-Wimbledon finalist and ex-No. 12, Sabine Lisicki, in three sets. However, in the third round she lost to Anastasija Sevastova.

At the 2016 Summer Olympics in August, she competed in the singles draw but lost in the first round to Angelique Kerber.

Performance timelines

Singles

Doubles

Mixed doubles

WTA career finals

Singles: 2 (1 title, 1 runner-up)

Doubles: 4 (1 title, 3 runner-ups)

WTA 125 tournament finals

Doubles: 2 (2 titles)

ITF Circuit finals

Singles: 28 (19 titles, 9 runner–ups)

Doubles: 21 (14 titles, 7 runner–ups)

Pan American Games

Singles: 2 (1 gold medal, 1 silver medal)

Doubles: 2 (1 silver medal, 1 bronze medal)

Junior Grand Slam finals

Singles: 1 (runner–up)

Playing style
Duque-Mariño has a playing style similar to Gabriela Sabatini. Her serve has a more complicated motion than most women, but her athleticism allows her to keep the parts working together pretty smoothly. Her forehand is a heavy-topspin forehand that she hits at shoulder level while falling backward. The weakest, and the most un-Sabatini-like, element of Duque-Mariño's game is her backhand. She has a two-hander, and most of its power and spin is generated with her left hand. This makes the stroke a little flippy and rushed; for what is essentially her rally shot, it's not all that safe.

Record against top-10 players

Notes

References

External links

 
 
 
 
 

1989 births
Living people
Colombian female tennis players
Sportspeople from Bogotá
Tennis players at the 2007 Pan American Games
Tennis players at the 2011 Pan American Games
Tennis players at the 2012 Summer Olympics
Tennis players at the 2016 Summer Olympics
Olympic tennis players of Colombia
Tennis players at the 2015 Pan American Games
Pan American Games gold medalists for Colombia
Pan American Games silver medalists for Colombia
Pan American Games bronze medalists for Colombia
Pan American Games medalists in tennis
Competitors at the 2006 South American Games
South American Games silver medalists for Colombia
South American Games medalists in tennis
Central American and Caribbean Games medalists in tennis
Central American and Caribbean Games gold medalists for Colombia
Central American and Caribbean Games silver medalists for Colombia
Medalists at the 2007 Pan American Games
Medalists at the 2011 Pan American Games
Medalists at the 2015 Pan American Games
20th-century Colombian women
21st-century Colombian women